The Roman Catholic Diocese of Sora-Cassino-Aquino-Pontecorvo is a Latin Church ecclesiastical jurisdiction or diocese of the Catholic Church in Lazio, Italy. It is exempt to the Holy See and not part of any ecclesiastical province. The current bishop of Sora-Cassino-Aquino-Pontecorvo is Gerardo Antonazzo, who was ordained a bishop on April 8, 2013 by Pope Francis.

History 
The Diocese of Sora originated in the 3rd century.
 
On June 27, 1818, it was united with the Diocese of Aquino and Pontecorvo, as the Diocese of Aquino, Sora and Pontecorvo, from September 30, 1986 known as the Diocese of Sora-Aquino-Pontecorvo.

On October 23, 2014, the lands of the Benedictine territorial Abbey of Montecassino which were not part of the abbey proper were transferred by Pope Francis to this diocese. It was then renamed to its current title. The various religious institutions involved in this transfer included 53 parishes.  In 2020 there was one priest for every 2,122 Catholics in the diocese.

Cathedrals 
The seat of the bishop is the Cathedral of St. Mary of the Assumption in Sora.

Both former cathedrals, St. Bartholomew the Apostle in Pontecorvo and Aquino’s Sts. Constantius and Thomas Aquinas Cathedral, are now ranked as co-cathedrals and were granted the status of minor basilica.

Bishops

Bishops of Sora
Latin Name: Sorana 
Erected: 3rd Century
 Leone (1050–?)
 Palombo (159-1073)
 Giovanni Ostiense (1073-1086)
 Roffredo (1090-?)
 Goffredo (1110?-?)
 Landolfo, O.S.B (1162?-?)
 Corrado (1167?-?)
 Cardinal Konrad von Wittelsbach (Apostolic Administrator 1167-1200)
 Bernardo (1174-1186)
 Pandulfo (1211?-?)
 Gionata (1221?-?)
 Guido (1238?-?)
 Fr. Piero Geatano (1252)
 Luca (1253-?)
 Pietro Gerra (1267–1278), appointed Bishop of Rieti 
 Andrea Perro (1279-1286)
 Bernardo, O.S.B. (1294-1295)
 Nicola (?-1295)
 Andrea Masarone (1296-1322)
 Giacomo (1323-1355)
 Ricasoli (1355-1357), appointed Bishop of Aversa
 Andrea (1358-1364)
 Martino Del Guidice (1364-1378), appointed Bishop of Tricarico
 Piero Corsari (1378-1397)
 Cola Francesco (1397-1399)
 Giacomo D’Antiochia (1399-1420)
 Giovanni Da Montenegro (1420-1432)
 Antonio Novelli (1433-1463)
 Angelo Lupi (1463-1471), appointed Bishop of Tivoli
 Giacomo (1471-?)
 Piero Lupi (1479?-1503)
 Matteo Mancini (1503–1505)
 Giacomo de Massimi (1505–1511), appointed Bishop of Città Ducale
 Bernardo Ruggieri (1511–1530)
 Adriano Mascheroni (1530–1531)
 Bartolomeo Ferratini (1531–1534), appointed Bishop of Chiusi
 Cardinal Alessandro Farnese (later Pope Paul III) (Apostolic Administrator 1534.01.19–1534.06.08)
 Eliseo Teodino (1534–1561), resigned 
 Cardinal Alessandro Farnese (Apostolic Administrator 1561)
 Tommaso Gigli (1561–1576), appointed Bishop of Piacenza 
 Giovanbattista Maremonti (1577–1578)
 Orazio Ciceroni (1578–1591), appointed Bishop of Ferentino 
 Cardinal Filippo Spinola (Apostolic Administrator 1585)
 Marco Antonio Salomone (1591–1608), resigned
 Giulio Calvi (1608–1608) 
 Michele Consoli, C.R. (1609–1609) 
 Girolamo Giovannelli (1609–1632)
 Paolo Benzoni, C.R.L. (1632–1638) 
 Felice Tamburelli (1638–1656) 
 Agostino De Bellis, C.R. (1657–1659) 
 Maurizio Piccardi (1660–1675) 
 Marco Antonio Pisanelli (1675–1680) 
 Tommaso Guzoni, C.O. (1681–1702), resigned
 Matteo Gagliani (1703–?) 
 Gabriele de Marchis (1718-1734) 
 Scipione Sersale (1735–1744), appointed Bishop of Lecce 
 Nicola Cioffi (1744–1748), appointed Archbishop of Amalfi 
 Antonio Correale (1748–1764) 
 Tommaso Taglialatela (1765–1768) 
 Giuseppe Maria Sisto y Britto, C.R. (1768–1795)
 Agostino Colaianni (1797–1814)

Bishops of Aquino, Sora, and Pontecorvo
Latin Name: Aquinatensis, Sorana et Pontiscurvi 
United: 27 June 1818 with the Diocese of Aquino and Pontecorvo

 Andrea Lucibello (1819-1836)
 Giuseppe Mazzetti, O. Carm. (1836-1838), appointed Titular Archbishop of Seleucia in Isauria
 Giuseppe Montieri (1838-1862)
 Paolo do Niquesa (1871-1879)
 Ignazio Persico (德斯馬曾), O.F.M. Cap. (1879-1887), appointed Titular Archbishop of Tamiathis
 Raffael Sirolli (1887-1899), appointed Titular Archbishop of Iconium
 Luciano Bucci, O.F.M. (1889-1900)
 Antonio Maria Jannotta (1900-1933)
 Agostino Mancinelli (1933–1936), appointed Archbishop of Benevento
 Michele Fontevecchia (1936–1952), resigned
 Biagio Musto (1952–1971) 
 Carlo Minchiatti (1971–1982), appointed Archbishop of Benevento 
 Lorenzo Chiarinelli (1983–1986), title changed to Bishop of Sora-Aquino-Pontecorvo

Bishops of Sora-Aquino-Pontecorvo
Latin Name: Sorana-Aquinatensis-Pontiscurvi
Name Changed: 30 September 1986

 Lorenzo Chiarinelli (1986-1993), appointed Bishop of Aversa
 Luca Brandolini, C.M. (1993–2009), retired 
 Filippo Iannone, O. Carm. (2009–2012), appointed Vicegerent of Rome 
 Gerardo Antonazzo (2013–2014), title changed to Bishop of Sora-Cassino-Aquino-Pontecorvo

Bishops of Sora-Cassino-Aquino-Pontecorvo
Territory added: 23 October 2014 with the Territorial Abbey of Montecassino

 Gerardo Antonazzo (2014–present)

References

External links
Contemplationi faventes, original text of the 2014 apostolic constitution redefining territorial jurisdiction of Montecassino

Roman Catholic dioceses in Lazio
Diocese
Diocese
Dioceses established in the 3rd century